Peter Chadwick may refer to:
 Peter Chadwick (cricketer)
 Peter Chadwick (mathematician)